Ramaria capitata is a species of coral fungus in the family Gomphaceae. It is found in Australia, where it is widespread and relatively common.

Taxonomy
The species was first described by American mycologist Curtis Gates Lloyd in 1922 as Clavaria capitata, from collections sent to him by Australian botanist Edwin James Semmens. Lloyd noted that it was unusual for a Clavaria species to have the fertile, spore-bearing surface (the hymenium) confined to terminal heads, rather than over the surface of the stems and branches. He humorously proposed the new genus Capitoclavaria using his pen name, Professor McGinty. The fungus was transferred to the genus Ramaria in 1950 by E.J.H. Corner.

References

External links

Gomphaceae
Fungi described in 1922
Fungi of North America
Taxa named by Curtis Gates Lloyd